Crimson Curtain (French: Le rideau rouge) is a 1952 French drama film directed by André Barsacq and starring Michel Simon, Pierre Brasseur and Jean Brochard.

It was made at the Saint-Maurice Studios, with scenes also shot on location at the Théâtre de l'Atelier.

Cast
 Michel Simon as Bertal / Banquo
 Pierre Brasseur as Ludovic Arn / Macbeth
 Monelle Valentin as Aurélia Nobli / Lady Macbeth
 Jean Brochard as L'inspecteur en chef
 Olivier Hussenot as L'inspecteur-adjoint
 Paul Barge as Le bistro
 Michel Barsacq 
 Edmond Beauchamp as Un acteur
 Lucien Blondeau 
 Louis Bugette 
 Daniel Cauchy as Léon
 Gérard Darrieu as Un machiniste au théâtre
 Jacques Denoël 
 Jacques Dufilho as Un acteur / An actor
 Michel Etcheverry as Un acteur
 Henri Gaultier 
 Madeleine Geoffroy 
 Gabriel Gobin 
 Françoise Goléa 
 Pierre Goutas
 Michel Herbault 
 Katherine Kath 
 Benoîte Labb 
 Paul Laurent 
 Robert Le Béal
 Serge Lecointe 
 Robert Le Fort 
 Robert Lombard 
 François Marié 
 Paul Mathos 
 Geneviève Morel as Pierrette - l'habilleuse
 Jean Moulinot 
 Hubert Noël 
 André Numès Fils 
 Marcel Pérès as Le machiniste qui fait du vent
 Jacques Rispal 
 Christian Simon 
 Georgette Talazac 
 Catherine Toth 
 André Versini as Un journaliste de la radio 
 Noël Roquevert as Sigurd 
 Charles Bouillaud as Le policier au commissariat
 Rudy Lenoir as Petit rôle
 Françoise Soulié as La jeune fille sur le banc

References

Bibliography 
 James Monaco. The Encyclopedia of Film. Perigee Books, 1991.

External links 
 

1952 drama films
French drama films
1952 films
1950s French-language films
Films directed by André Barsacq
Films with screenplays by Jean Anouilh
French black-and-white films
Films scored by Joseph Kosma
1950s French films